Lynne Marsha Abraham (born January 31, 1941) is an American attorney who served as the district attorney of the City of Philadelphia from May 1991 to January 2010. She was the first woman to serve as Philadelphia's district attorney. Abraham won election to that position four times.

She is also listed as one of the United States deadliest prosecutors, and was known for seeking and obtaining the death penalty frequently. She ran for Mayor of Philadelphia in the 2015 election, but lost the Democratic primary.

Early life
Lynne Abraham was born in 1941 and raised in Philadelphia and educated in its public schools. The daughter of first-generation Americans, she grew up on the margins of poverty.  Her grandparents were immigrants — a tailor and a butcher — from Europe. She studied at Temple University for her undergraduate degree and also received her Juris Doctor from Temple University Beasley School of Law. She was married to Frank Ford until his death in March 2009.

Career
Abraham is a former assistant district attorney. She served as a legislative consultant for the city council of Philadelphia. She served as the head of the Philadelphia Redevelopment Authority during the administration of Mayor Frank Rizzo. She was elected Judge of the Philadelphia Municipal Court in 1977, then was elected to the Court of Common Pleas in 1980, where she presided over criminal trials until she became district attorney in 1991.

District Attorney

Abraham was elected by her fellow Philadelphia judges to take over as District Attorney in 1991 when then-District Attorney Ronald D. Castille, later Chief Justice of the Pennsylvania Supreme Court, stepped down from the District Attorney post in order to run for mayor. The Board of Judges elected Abraham by a thin 39-37 margin.

As an incumbent, Abraham was elected to a four-year term in 1993. She was re-elected three more times; in 1997 (defeating challengers Jack McMahon and Leon Williams), 2001 (defeating challengers Alexander Talmadge and Leon Williams) and 2005 (defeating challenger Seth Williams, who would succeed her as District Attorney five years later).

Abraham held the office of district attorney longer than anyone else in Philadelphia history, during which time she saw 108 capital sentences returned. She earned the nicknames "Deadliest DA" and "Queen of Death" for the high rate at which her office, especially prosecutor Roger King, sought the death penalty in past decades.

In 2007, Abraham charged William J. Barnes for the murder of a police officer who Barnes shot forty-one years earlier during a failed burglary. The officer survived but died in 2007 from a urinary tract infection. Barnes had served twenty years for the incident but Abraham believed she could prove causation between Barnes' shot and the urinary tract infection. Despite Barnes having reformed his life, he was incarcerated until he was acquitted of the homicide in 2010.

In the 2004 presidential election, she served as one of Pennsylvania's electors, casting her ballot for John Kerry. In the 2008 election, she cast her electoral ballot for Barack Obama. Abraham retired in 2009, and was replaced by Seth Williams.

Later life 
Abraham ran for Mayor of Philadelphia in 2015 and finished third among six candidates in the Democratic primary. Abraham applied in 2017 to serve as interim district attorney following the resignation of Seth Williams, who had pleaded guilty in a federal corruption case. The Philadelphia NAACP publicly opposed any such appointment.

Abraham is co-founder of I-LEAD Charter School in Reading, Pennsylvania.

References

External links
 Lynne Abraham records

1941 births
Living people
Temple University Beasley School of Law alumni
District Attorneys of Philadelphia
2004 United States presidential electors
2008 United States presidential electors
Pennsylvania Democrats
Politicians from Philadelphia
Mumia Abu-Jamal